Gaspard Monge (1746–1818) was a French mathematician.

Monge may also refer to:
 Monge (surname), a surname and list of people with the name
 Monge (crater), a lunar crater
 French ship Monge (A601), a French missile range instrumentation ship
 French submarine Monge (1908), a Pluviôse-class submarine
 French submarine Monge (Q144), a Redoutable-class submarine